The 1911 Campeonato Carioca, the sixth edition of that championship, kicked off on May 7, 1911 and ended on October 22, 1911. It was organized by LMSA (Liga Metropolitana de Sports Athleticos, or Metropolitan Athletic Sports League). Nine teams participated. Fluminense won the title for the 5th time. No teams were relegated.

Participating teams

System 
The tournament would be disputed in a double round-robin format, with the team with the most points winning the title. The team with the fewest points would be relegated.

Championship

Qualifying tournament

First round

Finals

Championship

References 

Campeonato Carioca seasons
Carioca